Tiquadra guillermeti is a moth of the family Tineidae. It is endemic in Réunion island in the Indian Ocean, where it is quite common in natural and secondary habitats.

It has a length of approximately 8–9 mm.

See also
 List of moths of Réunion

References

Hapsiferinae
Endemic fauna of Réunion
Moths described in 1988
Moths of Réunion